Gali Gali Chor Hai is a 2012 Indian Hindi-language black comedy drama film directed by Rumi Jaffery, featuring Akshaye Khanna, Shriya Saran and Mugdha Godse in the lead roles, while Veena Malik appeared in an Item number titled Chhanno which gave a bounce to the film. The film's music was composed by Anu Malik. The film, produced by Nitin Manmohan under the banner of One Up Entertainment Pvt Ltd, was released on 3 February 2012, to mixed to negative reviews.

Plot
Part-time 'Hanuman' at the local 'Ramleela', but full-time cashier at the bank – that's Bharat, an 'Aam Aadmi'. He resides in the heart of Bhopal, with Nisha, a school teacher and his loving and caring, but doubting wife, who is concerned more about her husband's promotion from cashier to manager rather than his flying tricks onstage. Bharat's father, Shivnarayan, an old-timer who values freedom and hopes to see his country corruption-free someday, completes the small and happy family. However, there's also an uninvited houseguest in Bharat's household; Amita, a young, beautiful girl who works at a call center and often likes to hitch a ride with Bharat on his scooter, when he is not busy dropping his wife to her school.

Contrary to his wife's wishes, Bharat's sole ambition in life is to graduate from his role as 'Hanuman' to 'Lord Ram' someday. However, that puts him at loggerheads with Sattu Tripathi, the younger brother of the local MLA and a bad actor playing 'Lord Ram', who is perpetually annoyed at being upstaged by 'Hanuman'. His older brother, MLA Manku also has his share of problems with Bharat, who refuses to let out an extra room to him for his re-election campaign.

Bharat's happy little haven is disturbed rudely one day when the local 'havaldaar' Kushwaah comes knocking at his door, claiming to have caught a thief, Chunnu Farishta, who purportedly stole a fan from his house, a theft that Bharat has no idea about, though the local 'panwala', Bachhu Gulukand, is a sworn witness. Virtually ordered to come to court, Bharat finds himself suddenly dealing with made-up testimonies, lazy judges, and crooked characters of all sorts, trapped in the system that plagues the country today.

Out of nowhere, Bharat finds himself stuck in a hilariously vicious circle of corruption, having to bribe his way from cops to criminals, witnesses to lawyers, and even the judge, all in an effort to get out of the quagmire that is the Indian system. Along the way, this cashier-cum-Hanuman also finds his ideals again, learning to stand up for the rights of the common man and give a slap to the system, and becomes the subject of national news, exposing the thieves that line every lane here...!

Cast
 Akshaye Khanna as Mr.Bharat 
 Shriya Saran as Nisha Pandit
 Mugdha Godse as Amita Bedi
 Annu Kapoor as Constable Parasuram Khuswa
 Satish Kaushik as Bharat's father
 Akhilendra Mishra as Lawyer Duby Ji aka Ravan
 Sashi Ranjan as Mohanlal
 Vijay Raaz as Chunnu Pharishta
 Jagdeep as MunshiJi
 Murli Sharma as MLA Manku Tripathi
 Amit Mistry as Sattu Tripathi
 Mushtaq Khan as Constable
 Arun Verma
 Gulzar Dastur as Geeta Sharma
 Rajat Rawail as Bacchu Gulkand
 Anu Mudgal as Seeta
 Pankaj Sharma as Lakshman
 Mohit Baghel as Waiter
 Pranav Shekhar as Jamwant in Ramleela
 Veena Malik as an item number "Channo"

Reception

Critical reception
Taran Adarsh from Bollywood Hungama gave the film 2.5/5 and said "Gali Gali Chor Hai amuses intermittently, Fortunately the movie goes public at a juncture when anti-corruption appears to be the essence of the season. But the film could've done with a far more hard-hitting conclusion". Avijit Ghosh from Times of India also gave it 2.5/5 stating that "Gali Gali Chor Hai doesn't live up to its promise. Just like the anti-corruption movement at the moment." Rajeev Masand of Ibnlive gave it two stars saying "Never smart enough to be described as a satire, it fails ultimately because it's dreadfully dull" Mansha Rastogi of nowrunning rated it two stars and said "Having a relatable plot at hand, Gali Gali Chor Hai, could've worked with a tighter screenplay and better execution".
Karan Anshuman from the Mumbai Mirror gave it 1.5/5 and said "GGCH seems not only incomplete in thought but also technically: Basic scene to scene transitions missing, uneven sound". Shubhra Gupta
from The Indian Express also rated it 1.5/5 mentioning that "Gali Gali Mein Chor Hai' pours old wine into a cracked bottle. When the need of the hour is to underplay, everyone opens their mouth out loud, and yells. The only relatively new thing is the setting".

Box office
Gali Gali Chor Hai had a very decent opening at the box office. The film netted 30 million over its first weekend. And through its course it netted in at the Box office INR +57.7 million (US$1.15 million) thus Box-Office India declaring it an average.

Soundtrack

The music of this movie is composed by Anu Malik.. The music rights were sold to T-Series and released in January 2012. The Soundtrack contains six original tracks including two official remixes of Gali Gali Chor Hai and Chhanno.

References

External links
 
 Official Site 

2012 films
2010s Hindi-language films
2012 masala films
Films scored by Anu Malik